Abdul Karim Al-Orrayed (Arabic: عبد الكريم العريض; born in 1934) is a Bahraini artist. He co-founded the Arts Amateurs Association and Bahrain Contemporary Arts Association alongside Rashid Oraifi and Hussain AlSini.

Artist 
He established the first private art gallery in Bahrain in 1960. He attended most of the Arts Amateurs Association's exhibitions. He was a member of the Bahrain Delegation to the First Conference of the Plastic Arts in the Arab World in Syria in 1975.

Exhibitions

He participated in all exhibitions of arts for Bahraini artists mounted by the Ministry of Information; all Spring Art Exhibitions held by the Contemporary Arts Association; the 1976 exhibition of the Arab Union for Plastic Arts in Rabat; the 1977 Second Arab Art Exhibition in Algiers; the 1981 Bahrain Art Exhibition in Singapore; the 1983 Fourth Arabic Biennial in Jordan; the 1984 Cairo Biennial; and the 1984 Exhibition of the Bahrain Contemporary Art Association –Oman. He had personal exhibitions in 2002 and 2007.

Books
 Window on History 1999; 
 Art Harvest 2002; 
 Manama through Five Centuries 2006; 
 English edition of Manama People & Heritage 2009.
 Days Of Art & Literature 2013.

Prizes
He won several prizes in Bahrain and abroad including the 1984 State Art Encouragement Award, the 1999 Al Dana Golden Award in Kuwait. In 2007, he was awarded the Shaikh Isa Medal for his contributions to art

References

External links
 Abdul Karim Al-Orrayed page on Facebook
 جريدة الوسط: إشكالات «تدوين التشكيل» في البحرين
 جريدة الوسط: الفنان عبدالكريم العريض: التشكيليون البحرينيون عايشوا فترة صراع شديدة
 Contemporary Art Market in Bahrain – 2014
 Gulf Daily News: Multicultural Manama!
 International History Blog: Must-Read Book for Bahrain History Enthusiasts
 Art Bahrain: Al Riwaq Revitalising Art Community
 Al Riwaq Art Space: MANAMATNA

Living people
1934 births
Bahraini artists
Male artists